Heimerad (also known as Heimrad, Haimrad or Heimo) (c. 970 in Meßkirch near the Bodensee in Baden – 28 June 1019 on the Hasunger Berg (now Burghasungen) near Kassel) was a German priest and travelling preacher, popularly revered as a holy fool.

Life
Born of unfree parents, Heimerad undertook pilgrimages in Germany, Italy and Palestine. After his return to Germany he became a monk in Hersfeld Abbey, but was expelled after a dispute about wearing the order's clothing. Nor was he accepted in the monastery at Paderborn. Because of his conspicuous and unusual way of life he was driven from several places, and became more and more desolate. At length he found a site for a hermitage on the Hasunger Berg (today Burghasungen in Zierenberg). At first mocked and scorned even there, with the passage of time he came to be revered as a saint and his advice was sought by the great: he was acquainted with the Empress Kunigunde, Bishop Meinwerk of Paderborn and Aribo, Archbishop of Mainz. He died in 1019, on 28 June, which is his feast day.

The main source for his life is the biography written by the monk Ekkebert of Hersfeld between 1072 and 1090.

Aribo, Archbishop of Mainz, had a church built over Heimerad's grave on the Hasunger Berg two years after his death, in 1021, which served as the nucleus of Hasungen Abbey, founded in 1074. Pilgrimages to his grave reached their high point in the second half of the 11th century, when Hasungen ranked as the most visited place of pilgrimage in Germany next to the grave of Sebaldus in Nuremberg. In later centuries, especially after the dissolution of Hasungen Abbey in the 16th century, veneration of Heimerad tailed off drastically.

References
Ekkebert von Hersfeld: Vita sancti Haimeradi, ed. R. Köpke, in: Monumenta Germaniae Historica, Scriptores in folio, Bd. 10.
Keller, Hagen: Adelheiliger und pauper Christi in Ekkeberts Vita sancti Haimeradi, in: J. Fleckenstein und Karl Schmid (eds.): Adel und Kirche. Gerd Tellenbach zum 65. Geburtstag. Freiburg 1967, pp. 307–323
Struve, Tilman: Hersfeld, Hasungen und die Vita Haimeradi, in: Archiv für Kulturgeschichte, Band 51 (1969), Heft 2, pp. 210–233

External links
 http://daten.digitale-sammlungen.de/0000/bsb00000874/images/index.html?fip=193.174.98.30&id=00000874&seite=604
 http://www.santiebeati.it/dettaglio/91710

10th-century births
1019 deaths
People from Meßkirch
11th-century German clergy
German Roman Catholic saints
11th-century Christian saints
Year of birth unknown